Anthony Phillips may refer to:

 Anthony Phillips (born 1951), English guitarist
 Anthony Phillips (baseball) (born 1990), South African baseball player
 Anthony Phillips (offensive lineman) (born 1966), American football player
 Anthony Phillips (defensive back) (born 1970), American football player
 Anthony Phillips (weightlifter) (1940–2008), Barbadian Olympic weightlifter